Hanil Hyundai Cement Co., Ltd. is a cement and concrete company headquartered in Seoul, South Korea, established in 1969. It is a manufacturer of portland cement. Manufacturing is based in Danyang, Chungcheongbuk-do and Yeongwol, Gangwon-do. Hyundai Cement Co., Ltd. was originally a member of the Hyundai Business Group and split off into the Sungwoo Group. The founder of the Sungwoo Group, Chung Soon-Young, is the younger brother of Chung Ju-yung, founder of the Hyundai Business Group. The Sungwoo Group is headed by Chung Mong-Sun, the eldest son of Chung Soon-Young and is also involved in resorts.  Former and current affiliates of this group include Hyundai Welding Co., Ltd., Sungwoo Automotive Co., Ltd., Sungwoo Finance Co., Ltd., Sungwoo Precision Co., Ltd., and Hyundai Automotive Co., Ltd., disposal in 2016 Sungwoo Construction Co., Ltd., takeover in 2017 Hanil Cement Group.

See also
Hyundai
Economy of South Korea

References

External links
Hanil Hyundai Cement Homepage (in Korean & English)

Manufacturing companies established in 1969
Cement companies of South Korea
South Korean brands
South Korean companies established in 1969